Dimitrios Tserkezos (born 1 December 1987) is a Greek footballer who last played for Panegialios in the Greek Football League. He started his career with Doxa Drama. He also had spells with Panthrakikos, Kastoria, Ionikos, Niki Volos, Anagennisi Epanomi and Iraklis.

Career
Tserkezos started his career with his hometown's team Doxa Drama in 2004. He stayed with Doxa Drama for three seasons making a total of 47 appearances and scoring once. After leaving Doxa Drama in 2007 he had annual spells for Panthrakikos, Kastoria, Ionikos and Niki Volos. On 21 July 2012 he signed for Anagennisi Epanomi. After being released from Anagennisi Epanopi he signed a contract with Iraklis. He debuted for Iraklis in an away draw against AEL.

References

External links
Iraklis FC player profile

1987 births
Living people
Greek footballers
Doxa Drama F.C. players
Ionikos F.C. players
Iraklis Thessaloniki F.C. players
Kastoria F.C. players
Niki Volos F.C. players
Panthrakikos F.C. players
Association football fullbacks
Footballers from Drama, Greece